Mary Herbert may refer to:

Mary Herbert (born c. 1468), younger daughter of Mary Woodville
Mary Sidney (later Mary Herbert, 1561–1621), writer and Countess of Pembroke
Mary Herbert, Countess of Pembroke (d. 1649), née Mary Talbot (c. 1594–1649), wife of William Herbert, 3rd Earl of Pembroke
Mary Herbert (1686-1775), British-Spanish businessperson
Mary Balfour Herbert (1817–1893), Irish painter
Mary Eliza Herbert (1829-1872), Canadian publisher
Mary Alice Herbert (born 1935), American candidate for vice president in 2004
Mary H. Herbert (born 1957), American fantasy author
Mary Herbert (SOE agent), SOE agent

See also
Máire Herbert, Irish historian